Luther High School North, formerly known as Luther North College Prep, was a private coeducational high school located in the Portage Park neighborhood of Chicago, Illinois. It was affiliated with the Lutheran Church–Missouri Synod.

Its predecessor was Luther Institute, founded in 1909 as a Lutheran High School and located in the Near West Side neighborhood of Chicago. In 1953 the school moved to a campus in Portage Park, Chicago. Enrollment peaked at about 1,400 in the 1960s and 1970s, but declined thereafter. Due to financial difficulties, the Portage Park campus was sold to New Life Community Church in 2010, with the school sharing occupancy. In February 2017, with an enrollment of only 170 students despite recruiting efforts, the school announced that it would cease operations after the 2016–2017 school year.

Notable alumni
 David W. Anderson, "Famous Dave's" restaurateur
 Dale Carlson, former head coach of the Valparaiso Crusaders football team
 Ken Grundt, former MLB player (Boston Red Sox)
 C. R. Hagen, noted particle physicist
 Garry Puetz, former NFL player and Super Bowl XVII champion

References

Defunct Lutheran schools
Private high schools in Chicago
Secondary schools affiliated with the Lutheran Church–Missouri Synod
Defunct Christian schools in the United States
1909 establishments in Illinois
2017 disestablishments in Illinois
Educational institutions established in 1909
Educational institutions disestablished in 2017